The Beginning is a compilation album by Danish heavy metal band Mercyful Fate released in 1987 consisting of the Nuns Have No Fun EP and different versions of 4 tracks from the album Melissa.

Track listing
"Doomed by the Living Dead" – 5:07
"A Corpse Without Soul" – 6:52
"Nuns Have No Fun" – 4:17
"Devil Eyes" – 5:48
"Curse of the Pharaohs" – 3:50 |¹
"Evil" – 4:01 |¹
"Satan's Fall" – 10:28 |¹
"Black Masses" – 4:30 |²
"Black Funeral" – 2:52 |³
|¹ From "The Friday Rock Show". 19 March, 1983
|² From the "Black Funeral" single (B side)
|³ From the Metallic Storm compilation (Remaster only)

References

Mercyful Fate albums
1987 compilation albums
Roadrunner Records compilation albums